Candlemas, also known as the Feast of the Presentation of Jesus Christ, the Feast of the Purification of the Blessed Virgin Mary, or the Feast of the Holy Encounter, is a Christian holiday commemorating the presentation of Jesus at the Temple. It is based upon the account of the presentation of Jesus in Luke 2:22–40. Under Leviticus 12, a woman was to be purified by presenting a lamb as a burnt offering, and either a young pigeon or dove as sin offering, 33 days after a boy's circumcision. It falls on 2 February, which is traditionally the 40th day (postpartum period) of and the conclusion of the Christmas–Epiphany season. While it is customary for Christians in some countries to remove their Christmas decorations on Twelfth Night (Epiphany Eve), those in other Christian countries historically remove them after Candlemas. On Candlemas, many Christians (especially Eastern Orthodox, Roman Catholics, and mainline Protestants such as Lutherans, Anglicans and Methodists) also take their candles to their local church, where they are blessed and then used for the rest of the year; for Christians, these blessed candles serve as a symbol of Jesus Christ, who is the Light of the World.

History 

The Feast of the Presentation or Purification is one of the oldest feasts of the church. The pilgrim Egeria recorded how it was celebrated in Jerusalem in the 380s:

But certainly the Feast of the Purification is celebrated here with the greatest honour. On this day there is a procession to the Anastasis; all go in procession, and all things are done in order with great joy, just as at Easter. All the priests preach, and also the bishop, always treating of that passage of the Gospel where, on the fortieth day, Joseph and Mary brought the Lord into the Temple, and Simeon and Anna the prophetess, the daughter of Famuhel, saw Him, and of the words which they said when they saw the Lord, and of the offerings which the parents presented. And when all things have been celebrated in order as is customary, the sacrament is administered, and so the people are dismissed.

Christmas was, in the West, celebrated on 25 December from at least the year AD 354 when it was fixed by Pope Liberius. Forty days after 25 December is 2 February. In the Eastern parts of the Roman Empire, Roman consul Justin established the celebration of the Hypapante.

Pope Gelasius I (492–496) contributed to the spread of the celebration but did not invent it. It appears that it became important around the time of the Plague of Justinian in 541 before slowly spreading West. The ancient Romans celebrated the Lupercalia in mid-February, in honor of Lupercus, the god of fertility and shepherds. The celebration of Feralia occurred around the same time.

The Lupercalia has frequently been linked to the presentation of Jesus at the temple, particularly by Cardinal Caesar Baronius in the 16th century especially because of the theme of purification that the two festivals share. However, this is probably inaccurate since Lupercalia was not celebrated in Jerusalem, and it was only there that one finds some celebrations of the presentation of Jesus around this date. Pope Gelasius I had much earlier written a letter to senator Andromachus, who wanted to reestablish the Lupercalia for purification. The so-called Gelasian Sacramentary mentions the celebration of the Presentation of Jesus, supporting the conclusion that Gelasius substituted a Christian festival for a pagan one. However the Gelasian Sacramentary showed a strong Gallican influence and was compiled between AD 628 and AD 731. Hence, it is possible that the addition of the celebration was not due to Pope Gelasius at all.

Moreover, when Gelasius addressed Andromachus, he did not try to use his authority but contented himself to argue, for example, that the Lupercalia would no longer have the effect it once had and was incompatible with Christian ideals. This could be interpreted as evidence that he had limited influence on the Roman aristocracy.

Centuries later, around the year 1392 or 1400, an image of the Virgin Mary that represented this invocation was found on the seashore by two Guanche shepherds from the island of Tenerife (Canary Islands). After the appearance of the Virgin and its iconographic identification with this biblical event, the festival began to be celebrated with a Marian character in the year 1497, when the conqueror Alonso Fernández de Lugo celebrated the first Candlemas festival dedicated especially to the Virgin Mary, coinciding with the Feast of Purification on 2 February.  Before the conquest of Tenerife, the Guanche aborigines celebrated a festivity around the image of the Virgin during the Beñesmen festival in the month of August. This was the harvest party, which marked the beginning of the year. Currently, the feast of the Virgin of Candelaria in the Canary Islands is celebrated in addition to 2 February also on 15 August, the day of the Assumption of the Virgin Mary in the Catholic calendar. For some historians, the celebrations celebrated in honor of the Virgin during August are a syncretized reminiscence of the ancient feasts of the Beñesmen.

In Swedish and Finnish Lutheran churches, Candlemas is (since 1774) always celebrated on a Sunday, at the earliest on 2 February and at the latest on 8 February, except if this Sunday happens to be the last Sunday before Lent, i.e. Shrove Sunday or Quinquagesima, in which case Candlemas is celebrated one week earlier.

The Roman church's custom of blessing candles by the clergy found its way to Germany. The German conclusion that if the sun appeared on Candlemas, a hedgehog would cast a shadow, making a "second winter", was the origin for the modern American festival of Groundhog Day, as many of Pennsylvania's early settlers were German.

Customs

France and Belgium 

Catholic churches in France, Belgium, and Swiss Romandy celebrate Candlemas on 2 February. Tradition says that manger scenes should not be put away until Candlemas, which is the last feast of the Christmas cycle.

Candlemas in those countries is also considered the day of crêpes. Tradition attributes this custom to Pope Gelasius I, who had pancakes distributed to pilgrims arriving in Rome. Their round shape and golden color, reminiscent of the solar disc, refer to the return of spring after the dark and cold of winter. 
Even today, a specific symbolism can be associated with preparing the crêpes. A tradition is to flip the crepes in the air with the right hand while holding a gold coin (such as a Louis d'or) or some other coin in the left hand to have prosperity throughout the year. One has to ensure that the pancake lands properly back in the pan.

In Belgium, it is customary to eat pancakes. All the candles in the house should be lit. It is believed that a clear sky on Candlemas foretells a beneficial year for beekeepers.

Germany 
Candlemas used to be an important date (Lostag) in the year. It was associated with payment deadlines, fixed employment relationships, and the beginning of the "farmer's year". In addition, many customs, weather proverbs, other sayings, and rhymes are related to this feast.

The "farmer's year" began on Candlemas, and from then on, fieldwork or the preparations for it can be resumed depending on the circumstances. On Candlemas, the farmer should have had half of the winter food stock for his cattle. Depending on the proverb that one can eat by daylight on Candlemas, the time in which people worked with artificial light sources came to an end, as did when the women sat in the spinning room.

On this day, on the other hand, the "servant's year" ended. The servants were paid the remainder of their annual wages and could or had to look for a new job or extend their employment with the previous employer for another year, usually with a handshake. The custom of giving the servants a pair of shoes at Candlemas as a reward for further work or looking for a job was also widespread.

Luxembourg
In small groups, they roam the streets in the afternoon or evening of 2 February, holding a lighted lantern or homemade wand, singing traditional songs at each house or store, especially "Léiwer Härgottsblieschen". In exchange for the music, they hope to receive a reward in the form of sweets or loose change (formerly bacon, peas, or biscuits).

Puerto Rico 
This festivity officially finalizes the end of Christmas for Catholics in Puerto Rico; the festivities include a procession where the statue of Nuestra Señora de Candelaria (Our Lady of the Light) is carried on the shoulders. Others follow with lit candles until they reach the church where a mass is celebrated. In the evening, the festivities may continue with a giant bonfire and singing. Some families in the countryside burn their dried Christmas trees on this date as a culmination of the holiday season.

Canary Islands and Philippines 

La Virgen de la Candelaria or Nuestra Señora de la Candelaria (Our Lady of Light or Our Lady of Candles), popularly called La Morenita, celebrates the Virgin Mary on the island of Tenerife, one of the Canary Islands (Spain). Our Lady of Light is the patron saint of the Canary Islands. 
The Basilica of Candelaria in Candelaria, Tenerife is considered to be the main church dedicated to the Virgin Mary and a Basilica minor since 2009. Her feast is celebrated on 2 February (Candlemas, Fiesta de la Candelaria) and 15 August as the patronal feast of the Canary Islands.

In the Philippines, Our Lady of Candles is also the patroness of Western Visayas region. In Silang, Cavite, her feast is observed locally as a triduum from 1 to 3 February, with 2 February as the actual feast day.

Guatemala 
The Virgin of Candles is the patron saint of Jacaltenango, and her feast is marking the end of the Christmas season.

Mexico 
Dressing and adoration of the Christ Child and family meals with tamales on Candlemas are an important Mexican tradition. The customs of this feast is closely linked to that of the Epiphany, during which the tasting of the rosca de reyes (kings cake) will determine who is responsible for organizing La candelaria. Whoever finds the muñeco (bean-shaped Christ child) in the cake is named godparent of the Christ child, who will then dress the niño dios (an image of the Christ child in the form of a doll) on Candlemas with richly decorated clothes. This Christ child is then brought to the church to be blessed. Memories of these events are often passed down from generation to generation in families.

Following this is the family meal. Whoever draws the bean on Epiphany must also prepare tamales, believed to echo Mexico's pre-Christian past with its offerings of maize. The whole family is invited to this meal (often the same people as for the Rosca at Epiphany), which gives the festival an aspect of family and sharing. These celebrations occur not only in Mexico but also in Mexican communities worldwide, for instance, in France. It is for this reason that the Mexican tradition also appears in the Inventory of intangible cultural heritage in France.

Peru

The Virgin of Candles is the patron saint of the city of Puno in Peru, held in the first fortnight of February each year. It is one of the largest festivals of culture, music, and dancing in Peru. In terms of the number of events related to the cultures of the Quechua and Aymara peoples and of the mestizos of the Altiplano, and also in terms of the number of people directly and indirectly involved in its realization, it stands with the Carnival in Rio de Janeiro and the Carnaval de Oruro in Bolivia as one of the three largest festivals in South America.

At the festival's core are music and dance performances organized by the Federación Regional de Folklore y Cultura de Puno, consisting of more than 200 dances in more than 150 dance sets. These include "native dances" from the various communities in Puno and sets of dances organized in different quarters of the city, mostly those known as "costume dances". These performances directly involve 40,000 dancers and some 5,000 musicians and indirectly involve about 25,000 people, including directors, sponsors, embroidered, and the makers of masks, clothing, boots, shoes, bells, and other items.

See also 

 Liturgical year

References

Bibliography
 
 
 

Epiphany (holiday)
Pancakes
February observances
Christian processions